Arthur C. "Dutch" Lonborg (March 16, 1898 – January 31, 1985) was a basketball, American football and baseball player, coach, and college athletics administrator.

Basketball
The Gardner, Illinois native coached for 23 years at McPherson College, Washburn College, and Northwestern University. Lonborg graduated in 1921 from University of Kansas, having played two years under coach Phog Allen.

In 1921 Dutch won an Amateur Athletic Union (AAU) title as a player with the Kansas City Athletic Club Blue Diamonds. In 1925 he coached Washburn College to an AAU title, the last time a college team won that championship.  
Later he coached at Northwestern, getting 237 wins during his time there, and leading them to Big Ten Conference championships in 1931 and 1933. His 1930–31 team finished the season with a 16–1 record and was retroactively named the national champion by the Helms Athletic Foundation and the Premo-Porretta Power Poll. He had an overall 323–217 college coaching record at all three schools.

After he retired from coaching, he became chairman of the NCAA Tournament Committee from 1947 to 1960, succeeding Harold Olsen. He was the U.S. Olympic team manager for the 1960 Olympics. He also served as the Kansas Jayhawks athletic director from 1950 to 1963.

He was inducted into the Basketball Hall of Fame in 1973 as a coach.

Head coaching record

Basketball

 Due to a scoring error during the Notre Dame game in 1936, a game which was originally ruled a 21–20 win for Notre Dame was determined to be a tie when it was discovered Notre Dame had received one more point than they had actually scored. Notre Dame returned to the court to finish the game, but Northwestern refused to return to the court. The Wildcats left the building and the game was deemed a tie.

Football

References

External links
 

1898 births
1985 deaths
All-American college men's basketball players
Amateur Athletic Union men's basketball players
American football ends
American football quarterbacks
American men's basketball coaches
American men's basketball players
Basketball coaches from Illinois
Basketball players from Illinois
Guards (basketball)
Kansas Jayhawks athletic directors
Kansas Jayhawks baseball players
Kansas Jayhawks football players
Kansas Jayhawks men's basketball players
McPherson Bulldogs baseball coaches
McPherson Bulldogs football coaches
McPherson Bulldogs men's basketball coaches
Naismith Memorial Basketball Hall of Fame inductees
National Collegiate Basketball Hall of Fame inductees
Northwestern Wildcats men's basketball coaches
People from Gardner, Illinois
Sportspeople from the Chicago metropolitan area
Washburn Ichabods football coaches
Washburn Ichabods men's basketball coaches